Pickering Town Football Club is an English football club based in Pickering, North Yorkshire.

History 

Pickering Town Football Club were first established in 1888, for many years the club competed in the local football leagues.  One of the local leagues they competed in was the York Football League which they joined Division Two, in 1953–54. They were promoted to the league's top division after only one season.

In the early 1950s, the York League was heavily contended between York Railway Institute, Market Weighton and Pickering Town. Indeed, these were the teams in the top three when Pickering Town first won the York League in 1955–56.

The club dropped in form for the rest of the decade in comparison (although they did always finish in the top eight). During the 1959–60 season, they finished as league runners-up to Dringhouses.

Yorkshire and Northern Counties Leagues
Pickering eventually joining the Yorkshire Football League Division Three in 1972. They started well in the league, and during their second season were promoted to Division Two as champions. Pickering Town finished as runners-up to Bridlington Town in the 1974–75 season and thus were promoted to the top division of the Yorkshire League.

They dropped in form a couple of seasons later, getting relegated in two successive seasons. For the rest of the decade Pickering lingered around the mid parts of the Yorkshire League Division Three. In 1982 they became founding members of the Northern Counties East Football League and were in the NCE Premier Division from 1992. It was around this time that the club first entered the FA Challenge Cup, they knocked out Penrith before losing to North Yorkshire rivals, Northallerton Town in the next round.

A few seasons later in 1996–97, they knocked out Pontefract Collieries 2–1 in the competition, but lost to Bishop Auckland in the next round. In terms of the draw, the club has had very bad luck in the competition, as every time they reached the 1st Qualifying Round, they were forced to play away from home. In 1999 Pickering were relegated to the NCE First Division. This was to last only two seasons and promotion back to the Premier Division came in 2001.

Jimmy Reid transformation
The club underwent a great transformation with manager Jimmy Reid and his assistant Steve Brown in charge. Reid was a former player with St Johnstone and York City and Brown a former "Pikes" player and coach at the Leeds United Academy. At the end of 2001–02 season Jimmy Reid left the club and Steve Brown took control.

At the start of the 2002–03 season 5 first team regulars were lost for a variety of reasons which left the club struggling for much of the season. The hard work and dedication of Brown, his management team and the players was rewarded towards the end of the season as it all started to come together and with only 4 defeats in the last 15 league games the club finished the season in 13th position.

2003–04 season was an exciting one for the club as they were in the top half of the league table all season and for much of it, with games in hand, looked possible championship contenders. However, with a glut of fixtures, and possibly with the knowledge that promotion to the re-structured Northern Premier League was not an option due to ground grading, at the season's end the club were not able to capitalise and finished in a creditable 5th position.

Early into the season 2004–05 owing to ever increasing business commitments Steve Brown stepped down as Manager to be replaced by ex-Ipswich Town and Newcastle United striker Alex Mathie, veteran of over 200 league games and 20 years as a professional.

After much ground improvement work in recent years, including the erection of floodlights, a new 120 seater stand, covered standing accommodation and more recently an additional 100-seater stand behind the "scoreboard end" goal, the club now possess one of the best grounds in the league.

Recent events
In the 2005–06 season the club reached the quarter finals of the FA Vase the furthest in the club's history. The team eventually lost out to Nantwich Town.

After an encouraging start in the 2006–07 season, results took a turn for the worse over the winter period, and a run of one win in eleven games led to the resignation of Mathie as manager on 6 January 2007. Within a week, the board announced they had appointed ex-Pickering player and Mathie's assistant Mark Wood as the new manager.

The 2007–08 season saw the club finish in third in the NCEL Premier Division, their highest league position in over a decade. Off the pitch the club saw significant change and Pickering applied for promotion to the Northern Premier League. The club erected a removable fence for the cricket pitch side and improved the existing exterior toilet facilities.  Ground development has continued with the club resurfacing and floodlighting the car parking facilities, adding new goals, corner flags and dugouts and improving the drainage of the pitch.

Mark Wood stepped down as manager early in the 2010–11 season and he was replaced by Scarborough FC legend Mitch Cook. Cook oversaw a change in philosophy mainly focussed on youth and passing football. This approach had mixed success but the club eventually finished in a very respectable 7th. Cook resigned just before the end of the season to take up the vacant managerial role at rivals Bridlington Town taking with him much of the playing squad.

Following Cook's resignation the club invited applications and eventually offered the job to former York City player and coach Peter Vasey.

They reached the Second Round Qualifying of the FA Cup 3 times (1999–00, 2001–02 and 2003–04).

On 30 April 2013, the club won the North Riding Senior Cup for the first time in their history following a 3–0 win over Marske United. The goals were scored by Liam Shepherd, Liam Salt and Joe Danby in the second half. The game was played at the headquarters of the North Riding County FA in Stokesley in front of 439 spectators.  The Marske United side contained future Premier League player Jordan Hugill.

Paul Marshall era
In the summer of 2015, Paul Marshall left the manager's job at Tadcaster Albion and was swiftly appointed as manager of Pickering Town.  Denny Ingram joined him as a player and assistant manager.  Pickering finished sixth in the first season under Marshall and second in 2017, behind only champions Cleethorpes Town.  They reached the final of the North Riding Senior Cup in 2017, losing 3–1 to Whitby Town in the final at Middlesbrough's Riverside Stadium.

In May 2018 Pickering were promoted to Step 4 of non-league football following a 2–1 win away to Hall Road Rangers on the final day of the season.  They entered the Northern Premier League Division One East in August of the same year.
During the first half of the season the club entered the FA Trophy for the first time and reached the 3rd qualifying round knocking out 3 sides along the way before losing to Ramsbottom in a replay
In February 2019, after 25 game Marshall stepped down as manager. He was regarded as the most successful manager of the modern era at Pickering. In 3 1/2 seasons in change his record was P187 W104 D33 L46 F426 A265

Denny Ingram
Marshall was replaced by assistant manager Denny Ingram until the end of the season with fellow player coach Ryan Blott as his assistant.

After guiding Pickering Town to safety, the club announced that Denny Ingram would continue his role as manager into the 2019-20 Season.
After a 3-0 defeat to Tadcaster Albion, Denny Ingram was relieved of his duties as manager.

Steve Roberts
Former Pickering Town player and Scarborough Athletic first team coach Steve Roberts joined the club as manager. He appointed former Pickering Town, Leeds United and Whitby Town player Tony Hackworth as his assistant.

Pickering finished bottom of the Northern Premier League Division One East in 2021-22 and were relegated back to Step 5 after four seasons at the higher level. They were allocated a place in the 2022–23 Northern Football League.
After a disappointing start to the season Steve was relieved of his duties after finding player recruitment a tough ask in a new league.

Rudy Funk
In September 2022 the club appointed the charismatic former Rainworth, Long Eaton, Scarborough Athletic and AFC Mansfield manager Rudy Funk as the new manager.

Current squad 

The following are players who are currently signed on and have made a first-team matchday squad during the 2022-23 season.

 (also plays for British Army)

 (club captain)

 (player/coach)

Ground

The Mill Lane ground seats 200, with a total capacity of around 2,000.  It incorporates the Pickering Recreation Club clubhouse.

Honours
Northern Counties East Football League Premier Division
Runners-up: 2017-18

Northern Counties East Football League Premier Division
Runners-up: 2016-17
Northern Counties East Football League Premier Division
Runners-up: 1992–93
Northern Counties East Football League Division One
Runners-up: 1991–92, 2000–01
Northern Counties East Football League Division Two
Champions: 1987–88
Northern Counties East Football League Wilkinson Sword Trophy
Winners: 2000–01
North Riding County Cup
Winners: 1990–91
North Riding Senior Cup
Winners: 2012–13
Runners-up: 1993–94, 1994–95
North Riding Senior Cup 2012–13

Yorkshire League Division Two
Runners-up: 1974–75
Yorkshire League Division Three
Champions: 1973–74
York Football League First Division
Champions: 1955–56, 1966–67, 1969–70
Runners-up: 1959–60
York Football League Second Division
Champions: 1953–54
Scarborough and District Football League Division One
Champions: 1930–31, 1950–51
Runners-up: 1946–47, 1949–50

References

External links
 Official website

Football clubs in England
Football clubs in North Yorkshire
Association football clubs established in 1888
1888 establishments in England
York Football League
Yorkshire Football League
Northern Counties East Football League
Northern Premier League clubs
Pickering, North Yorkshire